Devendranagar is a town and a nagar panchayat in Panna district  in the state of Madhya Pradesh, India. Earlier before the merger it was part of Erstwhile Princely State of Ajaigarh.

Demographics

As of the 2011 Census of India, Devendra nagar had a population of 12,785. Males constitute 53% of the population and females 47%. Devendra nagar has an average literacy rate of 61%, higher than the national average of 59.5%: male literacy is 69% and, female literacy is 52%. In Devendra nagar, 18% of the population is under 6 years of age.

Temples

Devendra nagar is also known for its Ram temple, which is named Shri Ram Mandir. It has many idols, but the main idols are Lord Rama, Lakshaman and Goddess Sita. Ram Navmi is celebrated here with great Enthusiasm. Near about 7 kilometres from Devendra nagar there is a peaceful place named "Raja Dahar". There is a temple of Lord Hanuman Ji. Badwara village is also situated near Devendra nagar to the North side. A Famous and Siddh mandir of Sungha Baba is established there. It is called that Sungha Baba is avatar of Lakshman Ji.

References

Cities and towns in Panna district